Tony Morgano (August 19, 1913 – February 2, 1984) was an American professional boxer, iron worker, politician and boxing trainer'

During the 1930's Morgano was a left-handed professional boxer who defeated  Freddie Miller, Baby Arizmendi, Tommy Paul, Lew Feldman, and Johnny Jadick in non-title fights.

After his retirement from boxing, Morgano worked as an iron worker.  He later served as a Republican committeeman in the Ninth Division of the 26th Ward of Philadelphia. 

Morgano provided training to approximately 1,250 young boxers, and assisted many retired fighters

Early years

Morgano was  born and raised in Philadelphia on Montrose Street, to Paul and Concetta Morgano. Morgano had four brothers - Robert, Paul, Sam, and Edward and two sisters - Anne and Grace. His father Paul was an immigrant painter who died when he was five. 

Morgano started working after finishing the third grad.  He spent his leisure time watching boxers train at the Olympic gym at Broad and Bainbridge streets.

Amateur career

When Morgano started boxing at age 12, he only weighed 88 pounds.  According to the rules, all boxers had to weigh at least 100 lbs.  In response, Morgano would fill his shoes with lead weights so that he could weigh in at 105 lbs.

In his first year, Morgano won the Middle Atlantic AAU flyweight title. In the next three years, he won 21 fights.  Whenever Morgano won a bout, he was awarded a Walton watch. 

In order to help his mother support his family, after winning a bout, he would be awarded "a Walton watch.  He would then sell the watch to someone at ringside for $2 or $3 dollars and bring the money home to his mother.

Morgano went undefeated as an amateur defeating 22 fighters.

Professional career

Still a teenager, Morgano's professional career started when a promoter in Camden, New Jersey offered him $25 to be a stand-in boxer against Pee Wee Ross, an experienced fighter. On January 15, 1929, Morgano defeated Ross. He kept $5 dollars and gave $20 to his mother. Telegraphs revealed that much of his prize money in later fights would be sent home. 

When it became known that Morgano had fought for pay, his amateur days were done. At 15, he signed a contract with Max "Boo Boo" Hoff, a local promoter.  Prior to going with Hoff, Morgano was managed by Vincent "Jimmy" Barbieri who at the age of 102 told stories of "his boy" Tony.

Morgano boxed in the Philadelphia area until the age of 21, accumulating approximately 51 victories. He then teamed up with Frankie Caris, a middleweight, and traveled the nation boxing. While in California, Morgano became popular with many Hollywood celebrities. He defeated Georgie Hansford, Tommy Paul, and Lew Feldman taking 9 out of 10 rounds on April 5, 1935. His only loss was against Jimmy Christy.  In a later rematch, the two boxer had a draw.  

In 1935 Morgano participated in Gold Diggers of 1935, a film with Mae West, and a Western.

Upon his return to Philadelphia, Morgano won 13 fights and lost one (to Billy Maher).  Morgano had entered the Maher fight with two broken ribs and a fractured ankle. Morgano then defeated Tommy Speigal on September 27, 1940 for lightweight title.  However, because Morgano had come into the fight overweight, he was stripped of the title.  Later in 1940,  Morgano retired from boxing because of a shattered hand.

Morgano finished his boxing career with 55 victories, 11 defeats and at 25 kos.

After Boxing

During World War II, Morgano worked as a welder at the New York Shipyard in Camden. After the war he became an ironworker and worked on several major projects. He married a young woman by the name of Patricia and had three sons, Kevin, Tony and Michael.

Morgano became active in Republican Party politics serving as a committeeman in the Ninth Division of the 26th Ward.  He ran unsuccessfully for the Philadelphia City Council and for the Pennsylvania General Assembly.

Morgano worked in South Philadelphia, with young boxers at the Police Athletic League and the Southside Boys club. Ge trained some 1,250 boxers over 30 years. His Southside Boys club competed for and won on several occasions the Pennsylvania Golden Gloves tournament.

Morgano served as longtime president of the Veteran's Boxing Association, and worked  to better the lives of many ex boxers. Often staging events to support them.

Professional Record

Below represents a partial list of Morgano's professional bouts. Due to the incomplete record keeping of the time the list is unfinished and will be updated as more information becomes available.

References

1913 births
1984 deaths
Boxers from Philadelphia
American male boxers